Thomas Wallace Dunn (December 4, 1911 – April 21, 2004) was a Canadian-born Thoroughbred horse trainer.

Born in Minitonas, Manitoba, Wally Dunn went to Vancouver, British Columbia at age seventeen where he would find work in Thoroughbred horse racing. One of five brothers who became involved in the sport, his brother Wilson Dunn bred George Royal and brother George trained the 1965 Canadian Horse of the Year. In the 1930s, Wally Dunn took horses south to race at Santa Anita Park in Los Angeles, California.

Dunn's career as a trainer was interrupted by World War II when he served overseas with the Canadian Army. After the war, Dunn returned to train in California. Among his notable Thoroughbreds was in Correspondent who won 1953's Blue Grass Stakes at Keeneland Race Course and the following year the Hollywood Gold Cup Stakes at Hollywood Park Racetrack. Wally Dunn  had four horses compete in the Kentucky Derby and two in the Preakness Stakes. Correspondent's 5th-place finish was his most successful Derby and in 1962 Green Hornet gave a 6th place best in the Preakness.

In 1964, he trained Colorado King who also won the Hollywood Gold Cup Stakes and equalled the world record time of 1:46.40 for 1 1/8 miles in winning the American Handicap.  The South-African-Bred Colorado King followed his American and Gold Cup wins with a dominating win in the Sunset Handicap at Hollywood Park.

Wally Dunn died on April 21, 2004 at his home in Arcadia, California at the age of 92.

References
 Thoroughbred Times obituary
 Vancouver Sun – Wally Dunn's obituary dated April 24, 2004

Canadian military personnel of World War II
American horse trainers
People from Arcadia, California
People from Parkland Region, Manitoba
1911 births
2004 deaths
Canadian emigrants to the United States